Księżna Łowicka (also known as Noc Listapodowa) is a Polish historical film. It was released in 1932.

Cast
Stefan Jaracz - Grand Duke Constantine Pawlowicz 
Jadwiga Smosarska - Joanna Grudzinska 
Józef Węgrzyn - Major Walerian Lukasinski 
Stanislaw Gruszczynski - Alojzy Szczygiel, poet 
Amelia Rotter-Jarninska - Joanna's Mother 
Artur Socha - Lieutenant Piotr Wysocki 
Aleksander Zelwerowicz - Joanna's Father, Broniec 
Loda Niemirzanka - Chambermaid 
Jan Szymański - General Koruta 
Lucjan Zurowski - General Gendze 
Juliusz Luszczewski - Makrot, a spy 
Waclaw Pawlowski - Professor Szkaradowski 
Wanda Jarszewska - Honoratka 
Henryk Rzętkowski - Wartownik

References

External links
 

1932 films
Polish historical films
1930s Polish-language films
Polish black-and-white films
Films directed by Mieczysław Krawicz
1930s historical films